Bolotnikovo is a village (selo) in Lyambirsky District of the Republic of Mordovia, Russia.

References

Rural localities in Mordovia
Lyambirsky District